The Extreme Centre: A Warning is a 2015 book by British-Pakistani writer, journalist, political activist and historian Tariq Ali.

Synopsis
The book is a criticism of the politics of the "indistinguishable political elite" in the United Kingdom, and their devotion to capitalism. The book analyses what Ali sees as the failure of the European Union and NATO, political corruption in Westminster and the dominance of the American Empire.

Reception
In the Socialist Review the book was praised while in the Financial Times the book was criticised as "conspiratorial" and an "examination of the frustrations of the radical left". Ali was profiled and the book was previewed in The Guardian.

References

Books critical of capitalism
Books about politics of the United Kingdom
Books about imperialism
Books about foreign relations of the United Kingdom
Books about foreign relations of the United States
Books by Tariq Ali
2015 in British politics
Books about economic inequality
Verso Books books
2015 non-fiction books